Peter Taksøe-Jensen (born in 1959 in Copenhagen, Denmark) is a Danish diplomat. He has been the Danish Ambassador to Japan since 2019. The Ambassador represents the government of Denmark in Japan and is responsible for the direction and work of the Embassy.

Before his current post, Ambassador Taksøe-Jensen was Denmark's Ambassador to the United States from 2010 to 2015 and to India from 2015 to 2019. Before that he was Assistant Secretary-General for Legal Affairs at the United Nations. He was appointed to this position by UN Secretary-General Ban Ki-moon in August 2008. He replaced Larry Johnson.

Before joining the United Nations, Taksøe-Jensen served for more than two decades for the Danish Ministry of Foreign Affairs, which he joined in 1987. He worked in different areas in the ministry including the Legal Service, the Security Policy Department and the European Union Law Department and on various government commissions. He was posted to different places including to Vienna and to Brussels. Taksøe-Jensen has been Under-Secretary for Legal Affairs and Head of the Legal Service in the Danish Ministry since 2004.

In his capacity as ASG for Legal Affairs, Taksøe-Jensen was responsible for supporting the overall direction and management of the United Nations Office of Legal Affairs.

Taksøe-Jensen obtained his law degree from the University of Copenhagen.

Taksøe-Jensen is chairman of the conciliation commission, which should solve the border dispute between Australia and East Timor.

References

External links 

Royal Danish Embassy in New Delhi
Peter Taksøe-Jensen, UN Biography
Peter Taksøe-Jensen on Europe and Asia
Royal Danish Embassy in Japan

1959 births
Living people
Ambassadors of Denmark to the United States
Danish officials of the United Nations
University of Copenhagen alumni
Ambassadors of Denmark to Japan